Aclypea is a genus of carrion beetles in the family Silphidae. There are 11 described species in Aclypea.

Species

 Aclypea bicarinata (Gebler, 1830)
 Aclypea bituberosa (LeConte, 1859) (western spinach carrion beetle)
 Aclypea calva (Reitter, 1890)
 Aclypea cicatricosa Reitter, 1884
 Aclypea daurica (Gebler, 1832)
 Aclypea opaca (Linnaeus, 1758)
 Aclypea pamirensis Jakowlew, 1887
 Aclypea sericea (Zoubkoff, 1833)
 Aclypea souverbii (Fairmaire, 1848)
 Aclypea turkestanica (Ballion, 1870)
 Aclypea undata (Müller, 1776)

References

Further reading

External links

 

Silphidae
Articles created by Qbugbot